Kaskian may refer to:

 Kaskians, an ancient Anatolian ethnic group
 Kaskian language, spoken by these Anatolian people
 Kaska Dena, a Canadian First Nations people
 Kaska language, the language of the Kaska Dena

See also

 Cassiar (disambiguation)
 Kaska (disambiguation)
 Kaskas (disambiguation)
 Kaskaskia (disambiguation)
 

Language and nationality disambiguation pages